= Klaus Ring =

German microbiologist

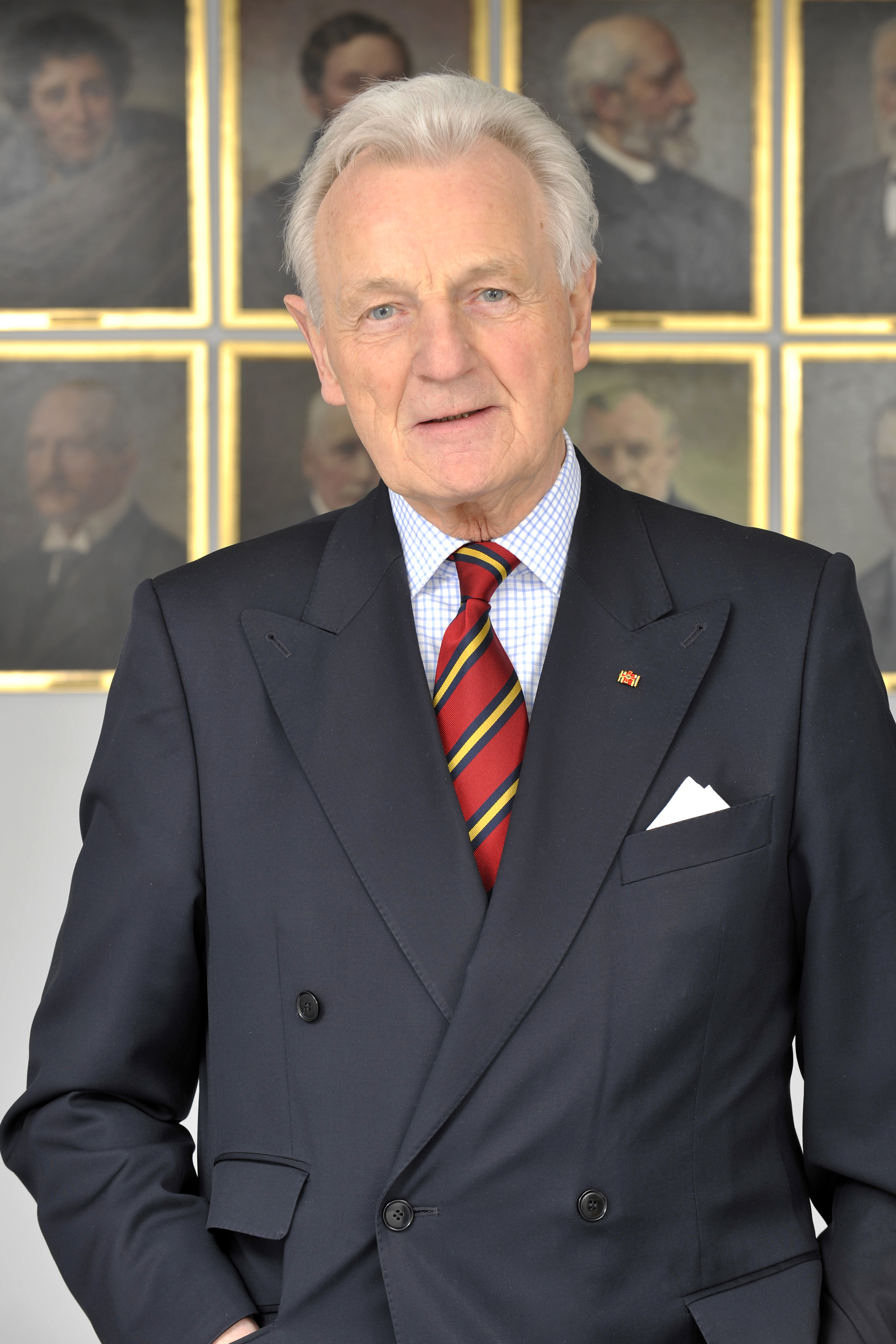
- Prof. Dr. Klaus Ring in front of the Presidential Gallery of the Polytechnische Gesellschaft e. V. (Photo: Stefan Krutsch / Stiftung Polytechnische Gesellschaft Frankfuzt am Main).
- Born: 25 February 1934
- Education: University of Göttingen; Goethe University Frankfurt; University of Kiel
- Scientific career
- Workplaces: Goethe University Frankfurt

Klaus Ring (born 25 February 1934) is a German microbiologist who served as president of the Goethe University Frankfurt from 1986 to 1994.

== Career ==
Ring studied microbiology and biochemistry at the universities of Göttingen, Frankfurt and Kiel and received his doctorate in Kiel in 1962. In 1968 he earned the habilitation and in 1971 he was appointed professor of microbiological chemistry at Frankfurt. Ring's scientific focus during this time was the structure and function of biological membranes. He was as visiting professor at the University of Hull (1974) and the University of Utrecht (1978–1979).

From 1980 to 1986 he was vice dean for preclinical studies and research, a board member of the university hospital and a member of the university senate. In 1986 he was elected president of the Goethe University. From 1988 to 1994 he was also vice president of the Rectors' Conference. From 1991 to 1994 Ring was a member of the presidium of the Comité de Liaison (the later European Rectors' Conference) in Brussels.

In 1994 Ring became managing director of Stiftung Lesen. From 2004 to 2014 he was honorary president of the Frankfurt Polytechnic Society. In this capacity he founded the Polytechnic Society Foundation in 2005.
